Champavati (Champawati) is an Assamese folk tale. It was first collected in the compilation of Assamese folklore titled Burhi Aair Sadhu, by poet Lakshminath Bezbaroa.

Summary
A man has two wives, one older (the man's favourite - Laagee) and one young (Aelaagee), and one daughter by each wife. The younger wife's daughter is named Champavati. One day, she goes to the rice fields and sings a song to shoo away the birds, but a voice answers her his desire to marry her. After she tells her mother about the event, Champavati's father agrees to marry her to whoever appears to them; so a snake comes to take the girl as his bride.

The snake and Champavati spend the night together, and the next morning she appears to her family decorated with jewels and golden ornaments. Her father and her step-mother, jealous of the girl's good luck, arrange a marriage between his other daughter and a snake he captures in the jungle. When the snake is placed with the girl, she complains to her mother - who is listening behind the door - that parts of her body are tickling, which the mother takes to mean that her snake husband is decorating her with bridal garments and jewels.

The next morning, they discover that the girl is dead. Their grief and rage are so great that they conspire to kill the Aelaagee (the younger wife) and Champavati, but the python devours both before they can do any harm to both women. The python then grabs his wife Champavati and her mother and takes them to a palace in the forest. They begin to live together. After her mother dies, Champavati is visited by a beggar woman who tells the girl her husband is a god underneath the snakeskin and urges her to burn the snakeskin, while he is away. Champavati heeds the beggar woman's words and does as she said, turning her husband into human definitively.

The same beggar woman returns another day and suggests Champavati to eat from her husband's plate. She decides to follow the suggestion and eats from his plate; she sees some villages inside his mouth and asks her husband to show her the world. He goes to the river and asks her if she wants him to show her the world in his mouth. She agrees. He goes to the middle of the river and opens up his mouth to show her the world. He tells her he will go away for six years, and gives her a ring to protect from any other demon that may want to devour her. He explains that his mother is a cannibal, and that he disobeyed his mother's wishes to see his married to a bride of her choice.

It happens as he predicts, but his ring protects Champavati. She seeks her husband after 6 years and finds him in his mother's house. Her mother-in-law gives her a letter to take to another demoness, with an order to kill Champavati. Her husband intercepts Champavati, takes the letter and kills his own mother to protect his human wife.

Analysis

Tale type
The tale is classified in the international Aarne-Thompson-Uther Index as AaTh 433C, "The Serpent Husband and The Jealous Girl", a subtype of type AaTh 433, "The Prince as Serpent". In this tale type, a girl marries a snake who gives her jewels and ornaments and becomes human after the burning of his snakeskin; another girl tries to imitate with a real snake, with disastrous and fatal results.

In his 1961 revision of the tale type index, American folklorist Stith Thompson indicated 5 variants of the type, found only in India. Hence, Thompson and Warren Roberts Types of Indic Oral Tales link this tale type "exclusively" to South Asia.

However, in his own revision of the folk type index, published in 2004, German folklorist Hans-Jörg Uther subsumed types AaTh 433 ("The Prince as Serpent"), AaTh 433A ("A Serpent Carries a Princess to Its Castle") and AaTh 433C under a new type: ATU 433B, "King Lindworm".

Motifs
Professor Stuart Blackburn stated that some Southeast Asian variants contain the motif of the fruit tree owned by the snake, whose fruits either the sisters or their mother want.

Variants

The Snake Prince (India)
In a tale collected by Sunity Devi, Maharani of Coochbehar, with the title The Snake Prince, a Maharajah is married to two Maharanis, an older one who is kind and gentle, and a younger one, of a striking appearance and who the Maharajah loves dearly. The younger Maharani becomes jealous of the older one, which worsens after the latter gives birth to a girl. The younger Maharani orders her husband to build a hut and to expel the older queen there. The older Maharani's daughter grows up in poverty. Years later, the girl goes to the jungle to gather firewood for fuel and hears a voice proposing to hear. She pays no heed to the voice, but talks to her mother about it. The Maharani convinces her daughter to accept the voice's proposal the next morning. She goes to the jungle and consents to be the voice's bride, who answers he will come in five days' time to marry her. She consults with a pandit, who assures her that the fixed date is most auspicious for a wedding. The elder Maharani and her daughter invite the king, the younger Maharani and other to see the mysterious bridegroom. At midnight, two palki-bearers bring the bridegroom: a huge python. The python marries the Maharani's daughter and they enter the hut for their wedding night. The elder Maharani stays outside and hears her daughter complaining about her body aching. The Maharani thinks her daughter is being eaten by the snake, but the hut doors open and there she is, safe and sound. The girl explains that the python was decorating her body with heavy jewelry, that is why her body was aching. She also reveals that the python is no python, but a handsome youth who will return the next night to live with her. The younger Maharani, fuming at the older one's luck, orders her servants to find a python in the jungle so she can marry it to her own daughter. The younger Maharani locks her own daughter into the chambers with the python. Her daughter screams to be let out and that her body is aching, but the Maharani thinks the python is simply decorating her daughter's body. The next day, she finds that the python devoured her daughter, and the Maharajah expels her from the kingdom. Back to the older Maharani, she talks her daughter to burn the python prince's snakeskin, so he can be human at all times. The python prince's wife burns his snakeskin in a fire. He complains about it at first, but he eventually accepts it, and explains that he was cursed as a python until he married a princess.

Humility rewarded and Pride punished
In a Bengali tale published by Francis Bradley Bradley-Birt, a weaver is married to two wives, each with a daughter. The elder wife and her daughter, named Shookhu, are idle, while the younger wife and her daughter, named Dukhu, work hard to maintain the house. After the weaver dies, the elder wife takes charge of the house and finances. Dukhu and her mother work by spinning cotton thread and selling coarse clothes at the bazaar. One day, while Dukhu is putting some cotton to dry out in the sun, a gust of wind blows it all over. The wind bids her to follow him. She goes and reaches a cowshed where a cow asks to be fed; further along, a plaintain tree that asks to be relieved of it bushes; a horse that also asks to be fed. She fulfills their wishes and reaches the house of the moon's mother, who welcomes her and tells her to refresh herself at a nearby pool. Dukhu dips her head in the water and becomes even more beautiful. She enter the moon's mother's house and is told to choose one of the boxes full of cotton, but chooses only a small box. On her return, the horse, the plantain tree and the cow gift her a winged colt, a baskets of gold mohurs and a necklace, and a calf that produces milk. Dukhu returns with the small box and Shookhu's mother, seeing the step-daughter's fortune, orders her own daughter to make the same journey, hoping she will also be rewarded. That night, after Dukhu and her mother fall asleep, the small box opens up and a prince-like youth comes out of it. Shookhu's journey is unlike her step-sister's: she refuses to help the animals and the tree and mistreats the moon's mother. When she goes to the river to bathe, she dives three times and her body becomes covered with warts and boils. She goes home with the largest chest and the cow, the horse and the tree humiliate her. Shookhu's mother is frightened at the sight, but expects a better outcome with the large chest her daughter brought. That night, Shookhu cries out to her mother that her body is aching all over, but her mother dismisses her complaints, thinking it is another bridegroom that emerged from the chest that is decorating her body. The next morning, the mother enters Shookhu's room and sees only a pile of bones and a cast-off snakeskin beside it.

A Tale of a Snake 
In a tale from the Angami Nagas of Assam, a girl is going to work in the field, when a snake appears and blocks her path. The girl tells the snake to not bite her, and she agrees to marry it. The snake bites the girl in her bosom and ornaments spring on her, then on her leg and leggings appear. Another girl sees the scene and tries to repeat with a snake, agreeing to marry it, but the snake bites her in the arm and she dies.

The Ash-Pumpkin Fruit Prince 
Author Henry Parker collected a tale from Ceylon (modern day Sri Lanka), titled The Ash-Pumpkin Fruit Prince. In this tale, in a village, a husband and a wife bring home an Ash-pumpkin and put it in a pot under seven earthen pots. Some time later, a snake appears in place of the gourd. The couple prepare seven beds, so large is the snake, and arrange an assistant (a wife) for the snake. They contact seven sisters who live in the village and one by one, they enter the snake's hut. Frightened at the large snake, they refuse to marry it, for fear for their lives. Only the youngest and seventh sister decides to marry it: she enter the hut, but complains that there is not enough space for her, so the snake spares one of the seven beds for her. This goes on for the next seven nights: on each night, the girl complains about lack of space to sleep, and the snake retreats from one bed on each night, until, after seven days, it comes to the verandah. The girl's mother-in-law teaches the girl to prepare food for her snake husband: "lower a little paddy from the corn store, and having winnowed, boil it". The girl prepares the food a certain way that displeases the snake husband, who teaches her the correct way to do it. The snake husband convinces his human wife to go. She tells him that other women are going with their husbands, so he suggests she goes with her in-laws, while he stays home. The human wife sees the prince, goes back home and burns the python jacket in the hearth. Some time later, the now human snake prince goes with his wife to visit his parents-in-law. His six sisters-in-law admire him and claim he is their co-husband, but the human wife reproaches her sisters. The eldest daughter, then, asks her father to find a python for her to marry, so he goes to the jungle, captures a python and gives it to his daughter. That night, the python - an animal, in fact - coils around the girl and begins to eat her. The next morning, the father notices his daughter's death and shoos away the python. The tale was also translated into Russian as "Сын из тыквы" ("Son in a Pumpkin") and classified by its compilers as tale type AaTh 433C.

The Snake Prince (Arakan)
Bernard Houghton published in the journal Indian Antiquary a tale from the Arakanese people that he translated from a Burmese manuscript furnished by a Maung Tha Bwin, Myôôk of Sandoway. In this tale, titled The Snake Prince, a man named Sakkaru, from fairy-land (Tâwatinsa), is reborn in the human realm in the form of a hamadryad (a spirit that lives in a tree), by orders of King Sakrâ (Indra). In the human realm, a washerwoman is washing her clothes in the river and sees a serpent (the hamadryad) atop a fig tree. She wants some of the figs, and offers one of her daughters, named Dwê Pyû, to the snake, in exchange for some figs. The serpent wags its tail and knocks down many figs. The washerwoman gets the figs and in jest exhorts the snake to follow her home to get his bride Dwê Pyû. The snake decides to follow the woman home. The next morning, the washerwoman is hungry and sticks her hand in a pot to grab some rice to cook, when the snake coils around her arm. It dawns on the woman that the snake is there to get his bride, so she convinces the snake to let her go, while she summons her daughter Dwê Pyû to meet the snake husband. The girl reluctantly agrees to live with the snake as husband and wife. One day, King Sakrâ summons Sakkaru (the snake) to a council in his realm, so Sakkaru leaves behind the snakeskin on his bed and goes to Tâwatinsa. His human wife, Dwê Pyû, sees the snakeskin and, believing her snake husband is dead, cries to her mother. The mother tells her daughter to burn the snakeskin as a sort of funeral rite, so they throw the snakeskin in the fireplace. Sakkaru returns to the human realm and complains that he felt some burning sensation. The washerwoman and Dwê Pyû realize who he is and rejoice, while the washerwoman's other daughter, named Shwê Kyên, begins to curse her sister's good luck. That night, fairy Samâ-Dêva visits Sakkaru and gives him a magic wand, and warns him that no drop of snake's blood can touch his skin, lest he becomes a snake again, and that, after receiving the wand, Sakkaru is to wander through other countries. The next day, Sakkaru departs on a ship, leaving behind a pregnant wife. Seizing this opportunity, Shwê Kyên tries to get rid of her sister, but she is saved by a great eagle, who is Sakkaru's brother. Seeing that her plans failed, Shwê Kyên asks her father, the washerwoman's husband, to bring her a snake from the jungle, hoping to experience the same luck as her sister. Her father captures a large boa constrictor and gives to Shwê Kyên. That night, the girl begins to scream that the boa is devouring her; her father dismisses any danger, but Dwê Pyû begs her husband, the Snake Prince Sakkaru, to save her sister. Sakkaru warns his wife that any drop of snake's blood will turn him back to a snake. He goes to Shwê Kyên's room and kills the boa-constrictor, but a drop of its blood touches his skin and he becomes a snake again, with a snake's mind. Sakkaru, back to serpentine form, tells his wife to take care of their son. Despite Dwê Pyû's pleas for him to stay with them, he slithers back to the forest.

A very similar tale was published by John Nisbet with the title The Tree-Snake Prince: Sakaru is identified as a Nat (deity, spirit) who lives in Tawadeingtha, a spirit-land. To atone for evil deeds, he is sent to Earth for three months by Thagyá Min in the form of a snake, to be a guardian spirit living in a wild fig-tree. The human family is a fisherman, his wife and two daughters: Shwe Kyin and Dwe Pyu. At the end of the tale, after the snake prince turns back into a snake due to the snake's blood after he saves his sister-in-law, Thagyá Min's deadline is lifted and he turns back to human shape to live with his wife and son.

The Snake Prince (Burma)
Burmese scholar Maung Htin Aung published a Burmese tale titled The Snake Prince. In this tale, a poor widow goes to the river bank to collect figs to earn money. One day, she notices a snake on the tree and asks it if it wants to marry one of her daughters, in exchanging for the figs. The snake drops all figs at the marriage proposal with the widow's youngest daughter, Mistress Youngest. The widow gets the figs and runs all the way home. The snake follows her and coils around the woman's body. The woman pleads to release her as she renews her proposals. The snake uncoils itself at the mention of the third daughter. The widow asks her daughters to comply with the snake, but only the youngest accepts. She and the snake marry, and they sleep at night, the maiden on her bed, the snake on a basket nearby. The maiden tells her mother that she has been having strange dreams about a handsome man that comes at night to their bed. That night, her mother spies the snake taking off his snakeskin and becoming a man. She seizes the opportunity to take the skin and burn it. The prince complains about his body burning, but his wife throws a pot of water on him. The tale continues with two variations on the follow up: a good ending, and a tragic one. In the tragic ending, the heroine's elder sisters become jealous of her good fortune, and ask their mother to bring them a snake to marry. The Snake Prince, now human, warns them that, now that he is human, his snake companions may not recognize him, and that not every snake will become a prince. The elder sisters still insist to marry a serpent and their mother brings from the forest a huge python and gives it to her elder daughter. That night, the large python, feeling hungry, slithers out of the basket and begins to devour the girl. She begins to scream that she is begin devoured, but her mother thinks she is being facetious about being decorated by her husband, but in the morning sees that her daughter was devoured. She begs her son-in-law, the Snake Prince, to save her daughter, but the Snake Prince warns that no drop of the snake's blood may touch his skin. The mother continues to beg him, and he kills the snake and opens its belly, rescuing a still alive girl. However, the snake's blood splatters on his hand and he becomes a snake again. He then slithers back to the forest.

How a girl married a python
In a Vietnamese tale titled "Как девица питона в мужья взяла" ("How a girl married a python"), an old widow lives in a poor hut with two beautiful daughters. One day, she takes a bamboo basket with her to get fishes in the river. She takes a path to return home when a menacing python blocks the way. The old woman begs for her life, since she has two young daughters to care for. The python's curiosity is piqued and it makes a deal with the old woman: one of her daughters as the python's bride in exchange for her life. The old woman goes home and asks which of her daughters will take a python for a husband; the elder sister declines, but the youngest accepts and leaves with the snake to its lair. She spends the night in the cave, but in the morning a handsome youth wakes her up and tells her he is the snake. They cut up some bamboos to make a house for them neat the river and live happily. One day, the elder sister goes looking for the younger one and sees the house by the river, the girl cooking by the fire and a handsome youth beside her. She realizes the youth is the snake and fumes silently. Seeing her sister's good luck, an idea brews in her mind: she goes to the woods to look for a python husband. She finds one that agrees to marry her and takes the girl to her lair. Unfortunately for the girl, this python devours her. Back to the old widow, she senses something wrong with her daughter and asks her son-in-law for help. The youth searches the woods for the girl and finds the python; he kills the python and revives his wife's elder sister.

Other tales
Professor Stuart Blackburn reported a tale from the Apatani people of Arunachal Pradesh wherein a girl marries a snake, burns its skin and turns him to a human youth; her sister, jealous of her success, finds another snake to marry and dies of a snakebite.

In a variant from the Dhimal language, collected from an informant in Sāno Bāhraghare, in Āṭhiyābārī, with the title The Snake Husband, an old man has five daughters. They all go to a kase tree to pluck kase fruits. Suddenly, a snake appears and threatens the man in giving one of his daughters as wife. The man asks his five daughters which will go with the snake, but only the youngest agrees to do so. The youngest goes with the snake and they reach a large and expensive house. The eldest daughter asks her father to arrange a snake husband for her also. He brings a snake for her and it bites her to death.

Anthropologist Verrier Elwin collected a tale from the Sherdukpen people, in Rupa, Kameng. In this tale, an old woman lives with her two daughters, the elder beautiful and somewhat skilled in weaving, and the younger more skilled, since she weaves more beautiful patterns. The former weaves only plain clothes. One night she goes to bathe in the river. A large snake appears in the water and frightens the girl back to the margin, but it turns into a handsome youth and assures the girl he means no harm. They fall in love with each other and see each other every night by the riverbank. One day, the girl complains that she wishes she could improve her weaving skills and the snake lover gives her a solution: she can copy on the loom the scaly patterns of his body. Inspired by her snake lover's body patterns, she weaves beautiful pieces of cloth. One day, the snake lover wants to marry her so they can live in his watery home. The girl seems reluctant at first, but eventually her lover calms her fears. Her mother asks her about her weaving skills, and she confesses about the snake lover. The mother warns her of a possible danger, since he is a snake. At any rate, the snake lover's procession comes to take his bride, their appearing as snakes to the whole village, but normal humans to her. She says goodbye to her mother, but tells she can call her by the river bank if she needs anything, then departs with her husband. Meanwhile, the younger sister wants to experience the same luck as the elder, and goes to river to find a snake to marry. She finds a black snake hole and, hoping it will become a handsome youth, she is killed by the black snake. Time passes, and their mother, now older, calls for her elder daughter by the riverbank. Her daughter appears and takes her to her husband's river palace, where she meets her grandchildren. Her son-in-law gives her a bundle with a rope, sand, wood and grain. She takes the bundle with her and its contents become food for her to eat.

Scholars Kristina Lindell,  and Damrong Tayanin collected a tale from a Kammu storyteller named Mr. Cendii. In his tale, titled Miss Sənlooy, a girl marries a snake that becomes a handsome man; another girl marries another snake and dies.

Portuguese scholars Isabel Cárdigos and Paulo Jorge Correia locate 12 Brazilian variants in the Portuguese Folktale Catalogue: the heroine marries a snake that becomes a human prince, her sister marries a snake and dies.

See also
Princess Himal and Nagaray
The Snake Prince
 The Fisher-Girl and the Crab
 The Ruby Prince (Punjabi folktale)
 The King of the Snakes (Chinese folktale)

References 

Indian fairy tales
Oral literature of Assam
Assamese literature
Fictional princes
Fictional snakes
Male characters in fairy tales
Female characters in fairy tales
Fiction about shapeshifting
ATU 400-459